Omar Mohammad Khaled (commonly known as Rumi, January 1950) is a Bangladeshi cricketer. A middle order batsman and a leg spin googley bowler, he played regularly for the national side between 1976–77 and 1983–84.

As a batsman
Playing for the North Zone side against the MCC at Rajshahi in 1976–77, he top scored in the first innings for his side scoring 27. Then at Dhaka he scored 28 and 32. He continued to be a regular run-getter for his side until his retirement. Yet, he failed time and again, to convert starts into scores. Too often, he got out between 20 and 35, after doing all the hard work. Lack of concentration was the main factor, although his poor running between the wickets didn't help his cause either. Nevertheless, two innings of his are worth mentioning here.

In early February 1978, a Decan Blues side led by the former Indian captain Ajit Wadekar came to Dhaka (on their way home from a tour of the Far East). They played a 3-day match against the local side. This game was important for the local side as they sought to regain some of their lost confidence following a disastrous home series against Sri Lanka.

Batting first, the tourists scored 410/7, (Ajit Wadekar 103*, M.V. Narasimha Rao 83). In reply, the local side was in immediate trouble losing their openers cheaply. Rumy, batting at his usual No. 3 position, decided to take the bull by the horns. After playing one over calmly, he blasted three fours in the next. Skipper Raquibul Hasan, batting at the other end was a mere spectator. Rumy only scored 32 before falling to the guile of M. V. Narasimha Rao. (Rao, the Hyderabad allrounder, was at that time on the verge of playing for the Indian test team.) But it was the best innings of the match. After Rumy's departure, Raquibul Hasan batted diligently to score 64, and Bangladesh saved the match by scoring 320 in the 1st innings. After the end of the tour, the opposition captain Ajit Wadekar described Rumy as the best Bangladeshi batsman.

The setting for his other memorable innings was the water Orton cricket ground in the English Midlands. It was Bangladesh's first ever international match abroad, against Fiji. On difficult conditions, Rumy scored a patient 28. None of the other top order batsman reached double figures, and it was only the tail enders who took the score past the 100 mark. Rumy's effort was overshadowed by the brilliant bowling of Syed Ashraful Haque (7/23) which helped Bangladesh win the match. But Rumy's contribution to the victory should not be underestimated.

As a bowler
A genuine all rounder, Rumy, apart from being a top order batsman, was the country's best leg spin bowler. His height helped him get extra bounce, and he had a well disguised googly. He had a highly successful spin combination with Syed Ashraful Haque and Lintu. The trio was in full flow at Dhaka, against the MCC in 1978–79. They bowled the tourists out for only 210, with Lintu taking 3/70, Rumy 3/63 and Ashraful 2/1. Earlier, at Jessore, Rumy with 4/30 and Lintu with 4/49 had bowled out the MCC for only 166. Against Hyderabad Blues, in 1983–84, he took 2 wickets, and along with the off spinner Azhar (4 wickets) restricted the strong Hyderabad batting line up to 280/9.

ICC Trophy performances

In domestic cricket
He played most of his League cricket at Dhaka with Abahani KC and Bangladesh Biman. In 1976–77, he played a big part in Abahani winning the League title. In the final (against Victoria SC), he took five wickets with the ball, and then followed it with an unbeaten half century. Late in his career, in the 1983–84 National final, he took seven wickets with the ball against a strong Dhaka University batting line up.

References

External links
 CricketArchive

Bangladeshi cricketers
Living people
Abahani Limited cricketers
Recipients of the Bangladesh National Sports Award
1950 births